The 2022 Tallahassee mayoral election was held on Tuesday, November 8, 2022, to elect the Mayor of Tallahassee, Florida. The vote was held subsequently along with the other statewide elections.

As of April 2022, four candidates had filed to run for the mayoral seat including. The candidates were Kristin Dozier, Leon County Commissioner, incumbent Tallahassee mayor John E. Dailey seeking a second term, Whitfield Leland III and Michael Ibrahim.

A first-round primary took place on August 23, 2022, where no candidate received the majority of the vote thus sparking a second-round runoff between Dailey and Dozier who both garnered most of votes in the August primary to become the main frontrunners in the runoff vote.

Dailey won re-election for a second term.

Background 
Following the 2018 mayoral elections, Leon County Commissioner John E. Dailey was elected for the City Commission Seat 4, Mayor post.

Electoral system 
All Tallahassee city commissioners, which include the Mayor of Tallahassee, Florida at Seat 4 are elected non-partisan for a four-year term through two-round system. If a candidate winning the most votes at the first round fails to garner enough to have a majority of 50% of the vote share, then a runoff election is held between two candidates who earned the most votes out of all other contestants in the first-round primary.

Candidates 
In order to appear on the ballot, candidates are required to file needed papers to the Leon County Supervisor of Elections with a contribution fee of $1,000 per Florida Statute or collect enough petition signatures (1% of registered constituent electorate) as an alternative with a noon May 16, 2022 deadline. Qualifying process takes place at the Supervisor of Elections Office between noon June 13 and June 17, 2022.

Declared

Endorsements

Polling

Results

First round

References 

Mayoral elections in Tallahassee, Florida
Tallahassee mayoral
Tallahassee